Chen Wu-hsiung (born 11 March 1944) is a Taiwanese politician. He was the Minister of the Council of Agriculture of the Executive Yuan from 2008 to 2012.

Council of Agriculture
As part of a public service career spanning four decades, Chen was deputy minister of the Council of Agriculture from 1999 to 2002. He then served as consultant to the Executive Yuan. He was appointed head of the COA by Liu Chao-shiuan in April 2008, and took office on 20 May 2008.

In December 2010, Chen said that the agricultural industry in Taiwan was gaining strategic importance due to the growing global food crisis caused by climate change and natural disasters. He stated that the Council of Agriculture (COA) was working towards health, efficiency and sustainability in agriculture, and also building on the growing concern over food safety and quality. The COA also had encouraged farmers to boost agricultural tourism through 242 agritourism farms and ranches across Taiwan. The COA also had promoted the use of non-toxic farming by encouraging farmers to reduce their use of chemical pesticides, synthetic fertilizers and additives during production.

Chen Wu-hsiung was not retained when Sean Chen took office as premier.

Later career
Chen Wu-hsiung began practicing Eight-Form Moving Meditation espoused by Dharma Drum Mountain in 2002. Chen devised Destressing Living Zen for use in daily life.

References

1944 births
Living people
Taiwanese Ministers of Agriculture
National Chung Hsing University alumni
University of Illinois Urbana-Champaign alumni
Kuomintang politicians in Taiwan